A Thousand and One Nights may refer to: 
 Tausend und eine Nacht (English: Thousand and One Nights) (1871), a waltz composed by Johann Strauss II
 A Thousand and One Nights (1945 film) a Tongue-in-Cheek Technicolor American adventure fantasy film 
 A Thousand and One Nights with Toho, a 1947 black-and-white Japanese film 
 Las mil y una noches, a 1958 Mexican film
 A Thousand and One Nights (1969 film) a 1969 adult Japanese anime feature film
 "A Thousand and One Nights" (Systems in Blue song) a single by German pop band Systems in Blue from their 2005 album Point of No Return
 "A Thousand and One Nights" (Smash song) 
 A Thousand Nights (novel)

See also
 One Thousand and One Nights (disambiguation) 
 Arabian Nights (disambiguation)
 1001 Nights (disambiguation)